Jogesh Chandra Ghosh (18874 April 1971) was a scholar, Ayurveda practitioner, entrepreneur and philanthropist. He pioneered the use of Ayurveda in British India and founded the Ayurvedic drugstore Sadhana Aushadhalaya. In the genocide during the Bangladesh Liberation War, he was shot to death by the Pakistan Army.

Early life 
Ghosh was born in 1887, in Jalchhatra village in erstwhile greater Faridpur district of Bengal Presidency in British India. His birthplace is now in Gosairhat Upazila of Shariatpur District in Dhaka Division of Bangladesh. In his childhood he attended the K. L. Jubilee School in Dhaka and appeared for the entrance examination in 1902. In 1904, he passed F.A. from Jagannath College in Dhaka. In 1906, he passed BA in chemistry from Cooch Behar College in Cooch Behar. In 1908, he passed MA in chemistry from the University of Calcutta. He was a student of Prafulla Chandra Ray.

Career 
In 1908, he joined Bhagalpur College as a lecturer in chemistry. In 1911, he became a Fellow of the Royal Society of Chemistry. He was also a member of the American Chemical Society. In 1912, he left Bhagalpur and joined Jagannath College as a lecturer in chemistry. He was the principal of Jagannath College during 1947–48. In 1948, he retired.

While at Bhagalpur, Ghosh began to take interest in Ayurveda. In 1914, he founded an Ayurvedic drugstore named Sadhana Aushadhalaya in Dhaka. The Ayurvedic medicine of Sadhana Aushadhalaya became popular and branches were opened in Bengal and other parts of British India. It also had distributing agencies in China, North America and Africa.

Later life 
After retirement, Ghosh stayed in his Dhaka residence and oversaw the activities of Sadhana Aushadhalaya, located at 21 Dinanath Sen Road in Gandaria. During the 1964 East Pakistan genocide, he sheltered the Bengali Hindus from the neighborhood in the factory of Sadhana Aushadhalaya.

In 1971, when the Pakistan Army launched Operation Searchlight and began killing the civilian population in Dhaka, Ghosh too was targeted. All the Hindu staff of Sadhana Aushadhalaya, fearing for life crossed the border and took refuge in India. At the age of 84 and invalid, Ghosh refused to move. He stayed at his establishment with two guards. On 4 April, the Pakistan Army led by a Peace Committee member entered the premises of Sadhana Aushadhalaya on look out for rebels. Ghosh was charged with providing shelter to the rebels. Four Pakistan Army soldiers forced Ghosh to move upstairs in his office, where he was shot dead. The soldiers ransacked the factory and office of Sadhana Aushadhalaya and looted more than 1 million rupees in cash.

Ghosh was married to Kiranbala Ghosh. They had one son and two daughters. After the liberation of Bangladesh, his son Dr. Naresh Chandra Ghosh revived the Sadhana Aushadhalaya.

Books

English 
 Whither Bound Are We
 Home Treatment
 Text Book of Organic Chemistry
 Simple Geography
 Simple Arithmetic

Bengali 
 Angnimandhya o Kosthaboddhota (Indigestion and constipation)
 Arogyaer  Path (The path to healing)
 Griho Chikitsha (Homeopathy)
 Charmo O Sadaron Sasthya Bidhi
(Skin and general health rules)
 Chokkhu - Karno O Mukhrog Chikitsha (Treatment of eye-ear-nose and mouth diseases)
 Amra Kon Pothe (Which way are we?)
 Ayurved Itihas (History of Ayurveda)

References 

1887 births
1971 deaths
Bengali Hindus
Bangladeshi Hindus
Ayurvedacharyas
People from Shariatpur District
People from Dhaka
People killed in the Bangladesh Liberation War